A guelta (also transliterated qalta or galta; Berber: agelmam) is a pocket of water that forms in drainage canals or wadis in the Sahara. The size and duration will depend on the location and conditions. It may last year-round through the dry season if fed by a source such as a spring. When a river (wadi) dries up, there may be  pockets of water remaining along its course (c.f. oxbow lake). In Western Sahara, gueltas correspond to oases.

Some examples include Guelta d'Archei in Chad and Timia in Niger.

References

See also
Billabong - term for a similar type of body of water in Australia

Aquatic ecology
Bodies of water
Geomorphology
Oases
Wadis
Wetlands